Martin Henry Conrad (November 30, 1895 – July 1, 1942) was a professional American football offensive lineman in the National Football League. He played four seasons for the Toledo Maroons (1922–1923), the Kenosha Maroons (1924), and the Akron Pros (1925).

References

1895 births
1942 deaths
American football offensive linemen
Kalamazoo Hornets football players
Kenosha Maroons players
Toledo Maroons players
Akron Pros players
People from Hartford, Michigan
Players of American football from Michigan